The Shelbourne Irish Open was a tennis tournament held in Dublin, Ireland between 2006 and 2008. The event was part of the ''challenger series and was played on outdoor carpet courts.

Past finals

Singles

Doubles

External links 
 
ITF search

ATP Challenger Tour
Tennis tournaments in Ireland
Sports competitions in Dublin (city)
Carpet court tennis tournaments